The Free Zone, Freezone, or more recently identified as Independent Scientology, comprises a variety of non-affiliated independent groups, organizations, and individuals who practice Scientology beliefs and techniques independently of the Church of Scientology (CoS). Such practitioners range from those who closely adhere to the original teachings of Scientology's founder, L. Ron Hubbard, to those who have adapted their practices far from CoS beliefs and practices.

The term Free Zone was originally only used by a single organization, but the term is now commonly applied to all non-CoS Scientologists, although many dispute the application of the term to themselves. The International Freezone Association, the group whose name became adopted as a generic term for independent Scientology, was not the first independent Scientologist group; the California Association of Dianetic Auditors, the oldest breakaway group still in existence, claims a founding date of December 1950, predating the Church of Scientology itself.

Skeptic Magazine described the Free Zone as: "a group founded by ex-Scientologists to promote L. Ron Hubbard's ideas independent of the Church of Scientology". A Miami Herald article wrote that ex-Scientologists joined the Free Zone because they felt that Church of Scientology leadership had "strayed from Hubbard's original teachings".

Etymology

The first group to use the term Free Zone was in the organization founded by the captain of the Apollo Flagship and Second-Deputy Commodore of the Sea Org, Captain Bill Robertson, in mid-1982, which is now known as "Ron's Org" in several countries.

The name came from the "space opera" beliefs of L. Ron Hubbard, which Robertson later expressed in the "Free Zone Decree", which he said was an Official Decree of "Galactic Central – Grand Council" which was "relayed from Mainship Sector 9":
The planet known as Teegeeack – local dialect "Earth" or Terra – Sun 12, Sector 9, is hereby declared a Free Zone.
No political interference in its affairs from any other part of the Sector or Galaxy will be tolerated.
No economic interference in its affairs will be tolerated from any non-planetary agency or power.
All of its inhabitants are hereby declared Free Zone Citizens and free of external political or economic interference.

Germany
Scientology Commissioner Ursula Caberta in Hamburg said that the Free Zone is a type of "methadone program for Scientologists", and, in any case, "the lesser evil". The Free Zone group, Ron's Org, says that the Verfassungsschutz Baden-Württemberg (State Office for the Protection of the Constitution) has stated that there is no need to keep Ron's Org under observation "as the Ron's Org has no anti-constitutional goals". There is some cooperation between members of the Ron's Org and state authorities who observe the Church of Scientology and investigate their activities.

The Church of Scientology and the Free Zone

The CoS labels all practitioners of and believers in Scientology without its sanction "squirrels"—a term Hubbard coined to describe those who alter Scientology technology or practice it in a nonstandard fashion. Among Scientologists, the term is pejorative, and comparable in meaning to "heretic". In practice, the hierarchy of the Church of Scientology uses it to describe all of those who practice Scientology outside the Church.

As of 2016, many of the major courses and publications in the Church have been altered or deleted altogether. This is a main protest and action point for Freezone Scientologists. Major courses, such as the Class VI and Class VIII auditor training courses, which had very high enrollment in the 1970s, have been shut down. Additionally, Scientology critics in the Freezone movement have claimed that alterations have been made to Hubbard's original writings in Church policies and even more so in technical bulletins, with parishioners never made aware of the changes to these writings.

The Church of Scientology has used copyright and trademark laws against various Free Zone groups. Accordingly, most of the Free Zone avoids the use of officially trademarked Scientology words, including Scientology itself. In 2000, the Religious Technology Center unsuccessfully attempted to gain the Internet domain name scientologie.org from the World Intellectual Property Organization (one of the 16 specialized agencies of the United Nations) in a legal action against the Free Zone.

The "Ron's Org Committee" (ROC) and the "True Source Scientology Foundation" (STSS, "Stichting True Source Scientology") have documented the argument that Scientology materials written by L. Ron Hubbard are in the public domain if certain assumptions are made. In addition the ROC has documented a legal battle over the trademark "Ron's Org".

One Free Zone Scientologist, identified as "Safe", was quoted in Salon as saying: "The Church of Scientology does not want its control over its members to be found out by the public and it doesn't want its members to know that they can get Scientology outside of the Church of Scientology".

Portrayal in media 
A 2006 Channel 4 documentary presented by Sikh comedian Hardeep Singh Kohli, The Beginner's Guide to L. Ron Hubbard, explored Scientology with the "Ron's Org" Free Zone group after the Church of Scientology declined to take part.

A 2017 episode of the docuseries Believer hosted by religious scholar Reza Aslan focused on Scientology; however, Aslan was unable to get in contact with any Church officials so instead the episode focused on and featured an array of Independent Scientologists. Aslan has compared the Freezone to other schisms in religious history, including the Protestant Reformation. Despite not returning his phone calls offering to be part of the episode, The Church of Scientology responded through their organization Scientologists Taking Action Against Discrimination (STAND) with harsh criticism of the episode and stated "not a single Scientologist appeared in the program".

Alternative auditing practices

Several alternatives to Dianetics were developed in the early years of the Freezone.

Synergetics is a self-help system developed by Art Coulter in 1954. American businessman, Don A. Purcell, Jr., founded an early Dianetics organization which had a tentative claim on the Dianetics trademark, joined Synergetics and allegedly returned the Dianetics and HASI trademarks ownership to L. Ron Hubbard when he was forced by Purcell's lawyers to close the failed Wichita Dianetics Foundation in a civil legal dispute over unpaid organizational bills and lawyers fees. The lawsuit was settled out of court amicably in 1954 in the United States. In 1976, Coulter published Synergetics: An Adventure in Human Development; he later founded the Synergetic Society, which published a journal through 1996.

Idenics is a personal counseling method not affiliated with any religion, that was developed by John Galusha beginning in 1987. Galusha researched for Hubbard during the 1950s, and was one of the founders of the first Church of Scientology in 1953. Galusha claimed that all personal issues can be addressed by thoroughly looking over the problem at hand, without judgment. The counselor asks a series of questions until the solution is considered found, by the client. Mike Goldstein, the owner of Idenics methodology and author of the book, Idenics: An Alternative to Therapy, claims that the method is as effective over the telephone as in person.

The word "Scientology"
Disagreement over the origins of the word Scientology has been used by Free Zone groups to contest Scientology's trademarks. A German book entitled Scientologie, Wissenschaft von der Beschaffenheit und der Tauglichkeit des Wissens was published in 1934 by Anastasius Nordenholz. The groups have argued that because Scientologie was not written by L. Ron Hubbard, the Church is unfairly monopolizing control over its practice. The trademark rights to the use of Dianetics and the E-meter (invented and created by Volney Mathieson) was allowed to lapse into the public domain in 1976 by Hubbard.

See also
 Advanced Ability Center
 Free Zone Association
 Process Church of the Final Judgment
The Secrets of Scientology

References

External links
The Association of Professional Independent Scientologists
California Association of Dianetic Auditors
Free Zone Alliance
Idenics
Ron's Org Committee
Ron's Org Grenchen, Switzerland
Ron's Org in Buenos Aires
Scientolipedia
Spiritech.fr in France

 
1950 establishments in the United States
Religious organizations established in 1950
Religious schisms
Scientology